Zainab Bukky Ajayi   (2 February 1934  6 July 2016)  was a Nigerian actress.

Life and career
Bukky Ajayi was born and raised in Nigeria but completed her higher education in England, United Kingdom with the support of a federal government scholarship. In 1965, she left England for Nigeria where her career began as a presenter and newscaster for Nigerian Television Authority in 1966. Ajayi made her film debut in the television series Village Headmaster during the '70s before she went on to feature in Checkmate, a Nigeria television series that aired in the early 1990s.

During her acting career, she featured in several films and television series including Critical Assignment, Diamond Ring, Witches among others. In 2016, her contributions to the Nigerian film industry was recognized after she and Sadiq Daba were awarded the Industry Merit Award at the 2016 Africa Magic Viewers Choice Awards.

Filmography

Death
Ajayi died at her residence in Surulere, Lagos State on 6 July 2016 at the age of 82.

References

External links

1934 births
2016 deaths
Yoruba actresses
20th-century Nigerian actresses
21st-century Nigerian actresses
Actresses in Yoruba cinema
Nigerian television actresses
Nigerian film actresses
AMVCA Industry Merit Award winners
Nigerian television presenters
Nigerian television personalities